This is a list of museums in Chad.

List 
 Chad National Museum in N'Djamena
 Musée Régional de Sarh in Sarh
 Musée d'Abéché in Abéché (defunct since 2018)

See also 
 List of museums

External links 
 Museums in Chad

 
Chad
Museums
Museums
Museums
Chad